The Boy Who Dared is a 2008 novel by American children's author Susan Campbell Bartoletti.  It is based upon the true story of Helmuth Hübener, the youngest person to be sentenced to death by the Nazis during World War II. He was arrested and killed on October 27, 1942 sent to a death penalty by guillotine.

Bartoletti fleshed out one episode from her non-fiction Newbery Honor Book, Hitler Youth: Growing Up in Hitler's Shadow (2006), into this novel.

Plot
The majority of the story is told through flashbacks, as Helmuth Hübener, charged with treason, waits in a Berlin prison for his execution. Starting with his memories as a young boy, Helmuth recounts his childhood growing up in Nazi Germany with his mother Mutti (German for "Mom"), grandparents, two brothers, his best friends Rudi and Karl, and his future stepfather Hugo, a Nazi soldier.

As a young boy, Helmuth plans to become a soldier and fight for Germany, but that changes when he grows up, and Helmuth stands out as a very knowable young man. He becomes very opinionated about the Nazi government when he sees his Jewish classmate's father mercilessly murdered by the SA.  Helmuth's brothers like Gerhard are separated as Gerhard goes to serve the country in marine work. He begins to secretly listen to forbidden enemy radio broadcasts and enlists the help of two of his closest friends in distributing anti-Nazi material. Helmuth uses pamphlets, to tell the truth about Hitler and the Nazis but ends up getting caught, because of his mistake, and he is executed by guillotine in Berlin, Germany.

Background
After Bartoletti finished her non-fiction Newbery Honor Book, Hitler Youth: Growing Up in Hitler's Shadow (2006), she wanted to expand on Helmuth Hübener's "amazing story" and "heroic actions" into another book. She chose fiction to explore deeper what his thoughts may have been and raise "questions about moral courage, nationalism, and the responsibility of the individual."

This story about Helmuth Hübener chronicles his years in school and his first job after graduation. Helmuth took an apprenticeship in the Bieberhaus, which is at the Social Welfare Department at City Hall. Although originally proud of the Fatherland and an enthusiastic participant in the Jungvolk, the Hitler Youth group, Helmuth became disillusioned as Nazi power and policies spread in Germany. Helmuth and a group of friends including Karl-Heinz Schnibbe, Rudolf Wobbe, and Gerhard Duwer, monitored banned radio broadcasts, in which the Allied Powers gave an accurate portrayal of the war in Europe rather than the version told through Axis propaganda. The friends printed pamphlets that were critical of Nazi Germany and distributed them to the public. Their activities were discovered by a co-worker of Helmuth's at the Bieberhaus and they were turned in to the Gestapo, where Helmuth was interrogated, beaten, and arrested for what was considered treason. Helmuth's friends received lighter sentences for their crimes. A brief trial for "show" was held at the People's Court or Volksgerichtshof, and at age seventeen, Helmuth Hübener was executed at Plotzensee Prison in Berlin, becoming the youngest person in history executed for opposing the Third Reich.

Contents
The book includes the author's note, pictures, a copy of the poster announcing Helmuth Hübener's execution, a 1936 map of Europe, and a Third Reich timeline, 1918-1945.

Awards
2009 Notable Books for a Global Society
2008 Booklist: Editors' Choice: Books for Youth, Top 10 Historical Fiction for Youth
Book Sense Children's Picks - Spring 2008
2009 ALA Best Book for Young Adults
NCSS Notable Social Studies Trade Books for Young People 2009, World History and Culture

References

External links

Discussion Guide for The Boy Who Dared from Scholastic Corporation

2008 American novels
 Novels set during World War II
 American children's novels
 American historical novels
 Novels set in Germany
Fiction set in 1942
2008 children's books
Mormonism in fiction